Milan Rundić (born 29 March 1992 in Belgrade) is a Serbian professional footballer who plays as a centre-back for Polish club Raków Częstochowa.

Club career

AS Trenčín
He came to AS Trenčín in summer 2013 together with his teammate Haris Hajradinović from Croatian club Inter Zaprešić. He signed a three-year contract, as did Hajradinović. Rundić made his debut for Trenčín against Slovan Bratislava on 28 April 2013.

Podbeskidzie Bielsko-Biała
On 7 August 2020 he joined Polish club Podbeskidzie Bielsko-Biała.

Honours

Club
Raków Częstochowa
 Polish Cup: 2021–22
 Polish Super Cup: 2021, 2022

References

External links
 AS Trenčín profile 
 Corgoň Liga profile 
 

1992 births
Footballers from Belgrade
Living people
Serbian footballers
Serbia under-21 international footballers
Association football defenders
FK Kolubara players
NK Inter Zaprešić players
AS Trenčín players
ŠK Slovan Bratislava players
MFK Karviná players
Podbeskidzie Bielsko-Biała players
Raków Częstochowa players
Serbian First League players
Croatian Football League players
Czech First League players
Slovak Super Liga players
Ekstraklasa players
Serbian expatriate footballers
Expatriate footballers in Croatia
Serbian expatriate sportspeople in Croatia
Expatriate footballers in Slovakia
Serbian expatriate sportspeople in Slovakia
Expatriate footballers in the Czech Republic
Serbian expatriate sportspeople in the Czech Republic
Expatriate footballers in Poland
Serbian expatriate sportspeople in Poland